Line 4 of the Changchun Rail Transit is a light metro line running from north to south Changchun. It was opened on 30 June 2011. It is currently 16.33 km long with 15 stations. Although it uses extended low floor LRVs, the line operates more like a metro, being entirely separate from traffic. This is similar to U6 of the Vienna U-Bahn.

Opening timeline

Stations

See also
Changchun Rail Transit

References

Changchun Rail Transit lines
Railway lines opened in 2011
2011 establishments in China